Esteves (Spanish: Isla Esteves) is an island in the Peruvian part of Lake Titicaca near the city of Puno in Puno Province, Puno Department. The Island has only one road, Sesquicentenario, but has a dirt road that encircles the island, as well as two helicopter landings.

Esteves Island also has a hotel, the Hotel Libertador Lake Titicaca Puno

References

Lake islands of Peru
Landforms of Puno Region
Islands of Lake Titicaca